Alexander Yakovenko or Oleksander Yakovenko may refer to:

 Alexander Vladimirovich Yakovenko (born 1954), Russian diplomat
 Oleksander Mykolayovych Yakovenko (born 1952), Ukrainian politician
 Oleksandr Pavlovych Yakovenko (born 1987), Ukrainian footballer
 Oleksandr Yakovenko (lieutenant colonel), Ukrainian soldier